The Cocoye Militia was a militia during the first and second  Republic of the Congo civil wars that fought for Pascal Lissouba.

History

Formation
The Cocoye militia was formed in 1993, Pascal Lissouba heavily distrusted the armed forces of the county and did not think that they would support them. He moved to form his own forces he could count on to support him. He pulled from army personnel and supporters from the Department of Niari, Lékoumou, and Bouenza to form the militia. He bought mercenaries from Israel, Serbia, and Zaire to train his militia.

First Civil War
During the first civil war the Cocoye militia was allied with Lissouba, they fought against the allied Ninja and Cobra militias. In Brazzaville, the Cocoye controlled the center of the city, the conflict ended up killing 2,000 and ended in the peace agreement with neither side gaining victory.

Second civil war
In June 1997 Lissouba feared a Coup d'état and sent the Cocoyes to arrest the leader of the Cobra's leader Denis Sassou Nguesso and disarm the militia starting the second civil war. Their Former enemy the Ninjas allied with them against the cobra, during the second civil war the Cocoye played a major role, capturing Moukoukoulou Dam and cutting power to much of the south.

References 

Militias in Africa
History of the Republic of the Congo